"The Strangest Party (These Are the Times)" is a song by Australian band INXS. The track was written by Andrew Farriss and Michael Hutchence and was included as a new track on their compilation album The Greatest Hits. Released as a single in October 1994, the song reached number 15 on the UK Singles Chart and number 30 on the Australian Singles Chart. The music video for the single features the band performing in a futuristic, black sci-fi like setting.

Background
The song "The Strangest Party (These Are the Times)", alongside the song "Deliver Me", was recorded for the group's Greatest Hits release with producer Chris Thomas, however, the music for the song was originally written by Andrew Farriss during the recording sessions of the band's previous studio album, Full Moon, Dirty Hearts. During the recording of "Deliver Me", the band wanted to add a second new track on the record, and decided to use the material that Andrew had previously written. The lyrics for the song were later added in by Michael Hutchence.

Lyrics
In one interview during the promotion of their Greatest Hits release, Hutchence described the song as a commentary on the band's lifestyle, particularly the lyrics: "You're part of the solution or part of the problem." He also mentions this in the album's liner notes: "I think this new album and especially the new single, 'The Strangest Party' sums up our time so far with INXS. It's certainly been the strangest party I've ever been to."

B-sides
The B-sides were a selection of remixes of album tracks as well as "Sing Something" a solo composition by guitarist Tim Farriss.

Track listings
INXCD 27 – CD single 1
 "The Strangest Party (These Are the Times)"
 "The Strangest Party" (Apollo 440 mix)
 "Wishing Well" (Courier extended mix)
 "Sing Something

INXDD 27 – CD single 2
 "The Strangest Party (These Are the Times)" (3:52)
 "Need You Tonight" (Big Bump mix) (8:27)
 "I'm Only Looking" (Bad Yard club mix) (8:07)

INXS MC 27 – Cassette and 7-inch red vinyl single
 "The Strangest Party"
 "Wishing Well" (Courier extended mix)

Charts

Release history

References

1994 singles
1994 songs
Atlantic Records singles
INXS songs
Mercury Records singles
Song recordings produced by Chris Thomas (record producer)
Songs written by Andrew Farriss
Songs written by Michael Hutchence